is a former Japanese football player.

Club statistics

References

External links

J. League (#31)

1990 births
Living people
National Institute of Fitness and Sports in Kanoya alumni
Association football people from Tokyo
Japanese footballers
J2 League players
Japan Football League players
Roasso Kumamoto players
Renofa Yamaguchi FC players
Tochigi City FC players
Association football midfielders